The men's pole vault at the 1962 European Athletics Championships was held in Belgrade, then Yugoslavia, at JNA Stadium on 13 and 15 September 1962.

Just before the meeting, the IAAF council approved the optional use of glass fibre poles.

Medalists

Results

Final
15 September

Qualification
13 September

Participation
According to an unofficial count, 23 athletes from 14 countries participated in the event.

 (1)
 (1)
 (2)
 (3)
 (3)
 (1)
 (1)
 (3)
 (1)
 (1)
 (1)
 (1)
 (1)
 (3)

References

Pole vault
Pole vault at the European Athletics Championships